Teranga is a genus of southeast Asian cellar spiders erected in 2018 for four species transferred from Pholcus after a molecular phylogenetic study of the Calapnita-Panjange clade of Pholcidae. The abdomen is long and thin, with a slight upward bend near the end. The name is derived from the Malay "terang", meaning "bright", referring to their light color.

Species
 it contains four species:
T. cibodas (Huber, 2011) – Indonesia (Java)
T. domingo (Huber, 2016) – Philippines
T. kerinci (Huber, 2011) (type) – Indonesia (Sumatra)
T. matutum (Huber, 2016) – Philippines

See also
 Pholcus
 List of Pholcidae species

References

Further reading

Pholcidae genera
Spiders of Asia